Acrosphaera is a radiolarian genus in the Collosphaeridae. The genus contains bioluminescent species. It is a genus of colonial radiolarians (as opposed to solitary).

Species
The following species are recognized:
Acrosphaera arktios (Nigrini, 1970)
Acrosphaera cyrtodon (Haeckel) Strelkov & Reshetnyak, 1971
Acrosphaera lappacea (Haeckel) Johnson & Nigrini, 1980
Acrosphaera murrayana (Haeckel) Hilmers, 1906
Acrosphaera spinosa Caulet, 1986
Acrosphaera trepanata

References

Radiolarian genera
Bioluminescent radiolarians